Tupaiidae is one of two families of treeshrews, the other family being Ptilocercidae. The family contains three living genera and 19 living species. The family name derives from tupai, the Malay word for treeshrew and also for squirrel which tupaiids superficially resemble. The former genus Urogale was disbanded in 2011 when the Mindanao treeshrew was moved to Tupaia based on a molecular phylogeny.

Unlike shrews, they possess a fairly large brain for their size. While some research has found treeshrews as the closest living relative to primates, most molecular studies currently find the flying lemurs (colugos) as the sister group to primates despite their gliding specializations.

Taxonomy
 Genus Anathana
 Madras treeshrew, A. ellioti
 Genus Dendrogale
 Bornean smooth-tailed treeshrew, D. melanura
 Northern smooth-tailed treeshrew, D. murina
 Genus Tupaia
 Northern treeshrew, T. belangeri
 Golden-bellied treeshrew, T. chrysogaster
 Striped treeshrew, T. dorsalis
 Mindanao treeshrew, T. everetti
 Common treeshrew, T. glis
 Slender treeshrew, T. gracilis
 Horsfield's treeshrew, T. javanica
 Long-footed treeshrew, T. longipes
 Pygmy treeshrew, T. minor
 Calamian treeshrew, T. moellendorffi
 Mountain treeshrew, T. montana
 Nicobar treeshrew, T. nicobarica
 Palawan treeshrew, T. palawanensis
 Painted treeshrew, T. picta
 Ruddy treeshrew, T. splendidula
 Large treeshrew, T. tana

Conservation
A majority of the species, 71.4%, in this family are of least concern, according to the IUCN red list. Nearly a twentieth of the species, 4.8%, are vulnerable and the same number are endangered. 19% of the species have not had enough data collected yet for them to be rated on the scale.

References

Treeshrews
Mammal families
Taxa named by John Edward Gray